Sheep's sorrel soup (Turkish: Kuzukulağı çorbası) is a  soup made from sheep's sorrel leaves, water, corn, beans, onions, butter and salt. Sheep's sorrel soup is a dish from the Black Sea city of Giresun popular among Turkish people. It may have a tart and lemony flavor. It may be served garnished with chives or bull thistle, among other ingredients.

See also
 Cuisine of Turkey
 List of soups

References

Turkish soups
Giresun